Polysoma is a genus of moths in the family Gracillariidae.

Species
Polysoma aenicta Vári, 1961
Polysoma clarki Vári, 1961
Polysoma eumetalla (Meyrick, 1880)
Polysoma lithochrysa (Meyrick, 1930)
Polysoma tanysphena (Meyrick, 1928)

External links
Global Taxonomic Database of Gracillariidae (Lepidoptera)

Gracillariinae
Gracillarioidea genera